Nadushan Rural District is in Nadushan District of Meybod County, Yazd province, Iran. At the National Census of 2006, its population was 1,048 in 360 households, when it was in Khezrabad District of Ashkezar County. There were 1,372 inhabitants in 450 households at the following census of 2011.

After the census, the rural district and the city of Nadushan were separated from the county, transferred to Meybod County, elevated to the level of a district, and divided into two rural districts and the city. At the most recent census of 2016, the population of the rural district was 216 in 68 households. The largest of its 44 villages was Neyuk-e Sofla, with 112 people.

References 

Meybod County

Rural Districts of Yazd Province

Populated places in Yazd Province

Populated places in Meybod County